Tarzan the Mighty is a 1928 American action film serial directed by Jack Nelson and Ray Taylor.  It was nominally based on the collection Jungle Tales of Tarzan by Edgar Rice Burroughs.  The film is now considered to be lost.

Cast

 Frank Merrill as Tarzan.  Joe Bonomo was cast as Tarzan but, while filming Perils of the Wild, fractured his left leg and severely injured his sacroiliac joint while performing a stunt.  Director Jack Nelson remembered Frank Merill from working with him on an earlier production, either Perils of the Jungle (1927) or The Adventures of Tarzan.  Whichever production it was, he felt that Merrill was a natural replacement and the new lead actor started filming the next morning.
 Al Ferguson as Black John, village ruler of Pirates' descendants
 Natalie Kingston as Mary Trevor.  There was no Jane in this production.  Kingston was cast as the castaway and love interest Mary Trevor.
 Bobby Nelson as Bobby Trevor, Mary's younger brother
 Lorimer Johnston as Lord Greystoke, Tarzan's uncle

Production
After the failure of Tarzan and the Golden Lion, starring "Big Jim" Pierce, FBO did not make a sequel.  Universal paid Burroughs an undisclosed sum to make a new Tarzan serial based on Jungle Tales of Tarzan.  This serial was later re-titled Tarzan the Mighty.

Merrill, who was the National Gymnastics champion from 1916 to 1918, came up with the vine-swinging technique. Merrill actually swung on a "vine" (a rope) with Kingston in one arm.  The footage was later studied by MGM for Tarzan the Ape Man (1932) and the subsequent series of Tarzan films with Johnny Weissmuller.

Production began on April 12 and finished on October 28, 1928  The serial was originally intended to be 12 chapters long but it was so successful that it was extended to 15 chapters in length.  Tarzan the Mighty was successful enough for a sequel, Tarzan the Tiger, to be put into production with many of the cast returning (in slightly different roles in some cases).

Chapter titles
 The Terror of Tarzan
 The Love Cry
 The Call of the Jungle
 The Lion's Leap
 Flames of Hate
 The Fiery Pit
 The Leopard's Lair
 The Jungle Traitor
 Lost in the Jungle
 Jaws of Death
 A Thief in the Night
 The Enemy of Tarzan
 Perilous Paths
 Facing Death
 The Reckoning

Novel 

Originally written as a 15-part serial for newspapers in 1926, it was collected and published as a released as a trade-paperback by ERBville Press in 2005.

Chapters 

  Jungle King
 Queen of His Kind  
 Black John Plots    
 A Pawn of Passion  
 Tantor Trumpets    
 Giant Emotions  
 Flaming Hate      
 Mock Marriage  
 Black John's Revenge   
 The Imposter   
 The Stolen Heritage   
 Treachery Higher Up  
 A Thief in the Night     
 Momentary Triumph  
 The Day of Reckoning

See also 
 List of film serials
 List of film serials by studio
 Tarzan in film and other non-print media
 List of lost films

References

External links

Stills and lobby cards at erbzine.com

1928 films
1920s fantasy adventure films
American fantasy adventure films
American black-and-white films
American sequel films
American silent serial films
Films based on short fiction
Films directed by Jack Nelson
Films directed by Ray Taylor
Lost American films
Mighty
Universal Pictures film serials
1928 lost films
Lost fantasy adventure films
1920s American films
Silent adventure films